Saffet Arıkan (1888–1946) was a Turkish politician and former government minister.

Biography 

He was born in Erzincan, Ottoman Empire. In 1910 he graduated from the Military Academy. After a brief service in Yemen, he was appointed to an office work in İstanbul. In 1915 he fought in the Battle of Gully Ravine (Kerevizdere) during the Dardanelles Campaign. Later he also served in the Mesopotamia. After the Ottoman Empire was defeated in World War I, he joined the nationalists in the Turkish War of Independence. He served briefly as the military attache of the newly founded Turkey in Moscow.

Beginning by 8 August 1923, he was elected as an MP in the 2nd Parliament of Turkey. He was reelected in the following terms. In the 8th, 9th and the 10th government of Turkey he was the Minister of Education and in the 12th government of Turkey he was the Minister National Defence. Between 1942 and 1944 he was the Turkish ambassador to Germany.

He is known as one of the pioneers of the Village Institutes. Although the project began after his term in the Ministry of Education, another project called "village trainer" (Turkish:köy eğitmeni) which was the predecessor of the village institutes began in 1936 during his term in the office.

He is also known as proposing the surname Atatürk to Turkish national leader Mustafa Kemal.

Arıkan committed suicide on 27 November 1946 in İstanbul.

References

1888 births
1946 suicides
20th-century Turkish diplomats
People from Erzincan
Ministers of National Education of Turkey
Ministers of National Defence of Turkey
Ambassadors of Turkey to Germany